Taqiabad (also Romanized as Taqīābād) is a village in Yateri Rural District, in the Central District of Aradan County, Semnan Province, Iran. At the 2006 census, its population was 35, in 9 families.

References 

Populated places in Aradan County